Paani is an American nonprofit humanitarian organization that provides water aid, emergency assistance and disaster relief in Pakistan. Its headquarters are located in Michigan, United States and it is managed by volunteers. As of 2022, Paani operates in Pakistan and Jordan and the organization has raised over $3 million. According to the organization, it has built over 10,000 water wells, and delivered millions of meals to rural families in Pakistan.

History
Paani, which means water in Urdu, was founded in 2017 at the University of Michigan and operated by student volunteers dedicated to alleviating the water and sanitation crisis in Pakistan.

Paani has focused largely on the most disadvantaged families in various districts of Sindh including Jacobabad, Mirpurkhas, Jaffarabad and Tharparkar. In response to COVID-19 pandemic in Pakistan, the non-profit has distributed over a million dollars of medical supplies to clinics including ventilators, electrocardiogram machines, cardiac monitors, and face masks to hospitals in Pakistan.

The non-profit has stood in solidarity with American social justice icons and movements by building wells in honor of George Floyd and Mohammad Anwar.

In July 2021, the organization worked with NBA superstar Kyrie Irving to build a solar water center in Pakistan. An effort that drew international praise from the Consulate General of the United States, Karachi.

During the summer of 2022, founder Sikander 'Sonny' Khan received the prestigious Diana Award and the Daily Point of Light Award for his efforts in creating Paani.

In August 2022, the organization built a school for child Afghan refugees in Swabi through a viral donation from DraftKings CEO Jason Robins.

Operations
The organization helped 7,551 families of three tehsils of Tharparkar district from 400 deep water wells and five solar-powered water wells in Pakistan, however across Pakistan the number is much larger. The nonprofit relies on a number of contacts including local construction companies to build the wells, while producing jobs for the unemployed. At the completion of each well, local community members are trained on the maintenance process to ensure longevity of the wells.

 Disaster Relief

During the 2019 Earthquake in Kashmir, Paani was involved in distributing emergency clothing and bedding in collaboration with other NGOs for the affected communities.

During the 2020 Karachi Floods, Paani was involved in both distributing cooked meals and delivering clean water via water tankers to the affected neighborhoods.

COVID-19 RELIEF
Paani supplied over 4,000+ families (avg. of 7 members) with at least 1-
month of food and hygiene kits, which included masks, sanitizers and
cleaning products
Supplied $500,000 of relevant medical supplies to a government
designate COVID-relief center to a health clinic in Lahore housed under
the Pakistan Kidney and Liver Institute.

Gardening
Paani's installation of solar-powered water facilities in Tharparkar allowed women to grow gardens.

Flood Relief
Paani raised over $26,000 in order to help alleviate the worsening flood conditions in Interior Sindh and Karachi, Pakistan in August 2020 and distributed hot cooked meals.

Fundraising
As an organization, Paani began with students raising funds by selling donuts at the Michigan Union until they were able to raise $600 to construct their first water well. As of 2022, most of their fundraising is conducted through LaunchGood and online donations via their website. The organization has raised over $3.5 million while maintaining $0 in overhead.

Notable Supporters 
 Rabia Chaudry
 Abdul El-Sayed
 Jeremy McLellan
 Tony Hawk
 Kyrie Irving
 Lindsay Lohan
 Amjad Saqib
 Mark Schlissel

References

Non-profit organizations based in the United States
Non-profit organizations based in Michigan
Organizations established in 2017
Water organizations in the United States
Water-related charities
2017 establishments in the United States
Charities based in Michigan
Pakistani-American organizations
Pakistani diaspora in the United States